Kanuti Sum (1934 – before 2007) was a Kenyan long-distance runner. He competed in the marathon at the 1956 Summer Olympics and the 1960 Summer Olympics. Outside of the Olympics, Sum was an athlete at the 1958 British Empire and Commonwealth Games. In his events, Sum had a top eight finish in the six mile and marathon events while finishing the three miles event in eighteenth.

References

External links
 

1934 births
Year of death missing
Athletes (track and field) at the 1956 Summer Olympics
Athletes (track and field) at the 1960 Summer Olympics
Kenyan male long-distance runners
Kenyan male marathon runners
Olympic athletes of Kenya
Athletes (track and field) at the 1958 British Empire and Commonwealth Games
Commonwealth Games competitors for Kenya
Place of birth missing